Lionair was an airline with its head office in the Asian Aviation Centre in Sri Lanka on the grounds of Ratmalana Airport near Colombo. It was a privately owned charter operator. Its main base was Ratmalana International Airport.

History 
The airline was established in October 1993. The airline started its operations on 24 October 1994. Initially it was owned by Lionvert Inc USA (51%), a United States-based investors group and by Sri Lankan investors (49%). Lionvert sold its stake in late 1997. Lionair suspended domestic services when an Antonov An-24 aircraft went missing shortly after it took off from Jaffna in 1998, but resumed services in October 2002.

Lionair had operated services between Colombo and Jaffna since October 1996, until the suspension of services in 1998. They had hoped to resume services in November 1998.

In 2005 Lionair applied to the Civil Aviation Authority of Sri Lanka to operate services to the following destinations: Athens, Chennai, Kochi, Denpasar, Dhaka, Dubai, Guangzhou, Jakarta, Kuala Lumpur, Kuwait, London, Malé, Melbourne, Mumbai, Rome, Singapore, Sydney, Tiruchirapalli, Thiruvananthapuram and Zürich, using Avro 748 and Airbus A320 aircraft.

Terminated routes

Fleet

Accidents and incidents
On September 29, 1998, Lionair Flight 602, operated by an Antonov An-24RV (Registered EW-46465), fell into the sea off the north-western coast of Sri Lanka under mysterious circumstances. The aircraft departed Jaffna-Palaly Air Force Base on a flight to Colombo and disappeared from radar screens just after the pilot had reported depressurization. Initial reports indicated that the plane had been shot down by Liberation Tigers of Tamil Eelam rebels. All seven crew and 48 passengers were killed.

References

External links 

2006 disestablishments in Sri Lanka
Airlines established in 1993
Airlines disestablished in 2006
Defunct airlines of Sri Lanka
Sri Lankan companies established in 1993